Line Kloster (born 27 February 1990) is a Norwegian athlete specialising in the 400 metres and 400 metres hurdles. She reached the semifinal of the 2013 European Indoor Championships where she set a new national indoor record of 52.78 narrowly missing the final.

International competitions

Personal bests
Outdoor
200 metres – 23.21 (+2.0 m/s, Bulle 2018)
400 metres – 52.78 (Oslo 2013)
100 metres hurdles – 13.54 (-1.9 m/s, Askoy 2016)
400 metres hurdles – 55.49 (La Chaux-de-Fonds 2018)
Indoor
200 metres – 24.30 (Steinkjer 2015)
400 metres – 52.78 (Gothenburg 2013)

References

External links
 
 
 
 
 

1990 births
Living people
People from Asker
Norwegian female sprinters
Norwegian female hurdlers
Athletes (track and field) at the 2020 Summer Olympics
Olympic athletes of Norway
Sportspeople from Viken (county)